James Cudworth may refer to:
 James Cudworth (engineer)
 James Cudworth (colonist)
 Jim Cudworth, American baseball player